Pesäpallo World Cup is an international tournament in pesäpallo that has been organised eight times so far: In Finland 1992, 1997, 2009 and 2017 in Australia in 2000 and 2012, in Sweden in 2003, in Germany 2006 , in Switzerland 2015 and in India 2019.

Women and mixed teams have been played in 1992 and again since year 2000.

Tournaments and medalists

Medal table 
The points have been counted as follow: Gold = 3 points, silver = 2 points and bronze = 1 point.

External links 
 2006 World Cup official pages 
 2015 World Cup official pages 
 Ylen Elävä arkisto: Crushing superiority in the final of the Pesäpallo World Cup 

Pesäpallo competitions
World cups
Recurring sporting events established in 1992